Flashpoint is a 1972 Australian film.

Plot
David moves to a mining town in northwest Australia. He befriends a veteran worked for the mining company, Foxy, and his wife Vicky. Vicky and David become friends, making Foxy jealous.

Cast
Serge Lazareff as David
Wyn Roberts as Foxy
Jan Kingsbury as Vicky
Hu Pryce as Ben
Kevin Leslie as Arthur
Barry Donnelly as Andy
Harry Lawrence as Jimmy
Ben Gabriel as mine manager

Production
Film Australia were inspired to make further drama productions following the success of Three to Go (1970). They originally planned to make two films with common characters and opening scenes about the separate experiences of a father and son – the father would be a tradesman cop gin with unemployment at middle age while the son faces a new job. The film about the father, written by Frank Moorhouse, was abandoned but the other film became Flashpoint.

Filming took place in the mining town of Newman approx 1200 km north of Perth in the Pilbara.  Brian Hannant spent several weeks working among mining crews incognito, then developing a script with Frank Hardy and, later, British TV writer Harold Lander.

A subplot was written and shot where David had an affair with kindergarten teacher played by Kirrily Nolan. This was cut to keep the running time down.

Release
The film was distributed widely through non-commercial libraries in Australia and screened on television in 1973.

References

External links

Flashpoint at Oz Movies

1972 films
Australian drama films
Films directed by Brian Hannant
1970s English-language films
1970s Australian films